Szászvár is a village in Baranya county, Hungary.

References

External links

  in Hungarian

Populated places in Baranya County